The LIV Golf Invitational Portland is a professional golf tournament that was held in North Plains, Oregon, outside of Portland at Pumpkin Ridge Golf Club. The inaugural tournament was held in July 2022 as part of the LIV Golf Invitational Series, a golf series led by Greg Norman and funded by the Saudi Arabian Public Investment Fund.

Format
The tournament was a 54-hole individual stroke play event, with a team element. Four man teams were selected via a draft by their designated team captains, with a set number of their total scores counting for the team on each day. Each round commenced with a shotgun start, with the leaders beginning on the first hole for the final round, in order to finish on the eighteenth.

Inaugural field
48 golfers participated in the inaugural LIV Portland event. 48 golfers were invited to play.

Abraham Ancer
Richard Bland
Itthipat Buranatanyarat
Laurie Canter
Eugenio Chacarra
Bryson DeChambeau (c)
Hennie du Plessis
Sergio García (c)
Talor Gooch
Branden Grace
Justin Harding
Sam Horsfield
Yuki Inamori
Dustin Johnson (c)
Matt Jones
Sadom Kaewkanjana
Martin Kaymer (c)
Phachara Khongwatmai
Sihwan Kim
Ryosuke Kinoshita
Brooks Koepka (c)
Chase Koepka
Jinichiro Kozuma
Graeme McDowell (c)
Phil Mickelson (c)
Jediah Morgan
Kevin Na (c)
Shaun Norris
Louis Oosthuizen (c)
Wade Ormsby (c)
Carlos Ortiz
Adrián Otaegui
Pat Perez
Turk Pettit
James Piot
Ian Poulter
Patrick Reed
Travis Smyth
Ian Snyman
Hudson Swafford
Charl Schwartzel
Hideto Tanihara (c)
Peter Uihlein
Scott Vincent
Lee Westwood (c)
Bernd Wiesberger
Blake Windred
Matthew Wolff

Teams
4 Aces GC: Johnson (c), Gooch, Perez, Reed
Cleeks GC: Kaymer (c), Pettit, Snyman, Vincent
Crusher GC: DeChambeau (c), Harding, Norris, Uihlein
Fireball GC: García (c), Ancer, Chacarra, Ortiz
HY Flyers GC: Mickelson (c), Buranatanyarat, Wiesberger, Wolff
Iron Heads GC: Na (c), Kaewkanjana, Khongwatmai, Kim
Majesticks GC: Westwood (c), Canter, Horsfield, Poulter
Niblicks GC: McDowell (c), Piot, Smyth, Swafford
Punch GC: Ormsby (c), Jones, Morgan, Windred
Smash GC: B. Koepka (c), Bland, C. Koepka, Otaegui
Stinger GC: Oosthuizen (c), du Plessis, Grace, Schwartzel
Torque GC: Tanihara (c), Kinoshita, Kozuma, Inamori

Winners

Individual

Team

Notes

References

Portland
Golf in Oregon
July 2022 sports events in the United States